is a Japanese former tennis player.

Miyamura won four singles titles and 20 doubles titles on the ITF Circuit in her career. On 21 April 2014, she reached her best singles ranking of world No. 310. On 21 October 2013, she peaked at No. 110 in the doubles rankings.

In April 2013, Miyamura won her biggest doubles titles, partnering Varatchaya Wongteanchai at the 2013 ITF Wenshan, a $50k event.

ITF Circuit finals

Singles: 7 (4 titles, 3 runner-ups)

Doubles: 28 (20 titles, 18 runner-ups)

External links

 
 
 Miki Miyamura at the Japan Tennis Association 

1985 births
Living people
Sportspeople from Tokyo Metropolis
People from Kodaira, Tokyo
Japanese female tennis players
Universiade medalists in tennis
Waseda University alumni
Universiade bronze medalists for Japan
Medalists at the 2009 Summer Universiade
21st-century Japanese women